The heavenly hill rat (Bunomys coelestis) is a species of rodent in the family Muridae. It is found only in southwestern Sulawesi, Indonesia, where it has only been found on Mount Lompobatang. Its natural habitat is subtropical or tropical dry forest. It is threatened by habitat loss.

References

Bunomys
Rodents of Sulawesi
Mammals described in 1896
Taxa named by Oldfield Thomas
Taxonomy articles created by Polbot